Leonardo Fernando Vanegas Barcia (born 16 July 1982) is an Ecuadorian football manager and former player who played as a right back. He is the current manager of Gualaceo.

Career
He retired in 2004, and became a manager of Deportivo Cuenca's youth categories.

Vanegas became Gualaceo's manager in July 2021, after Segarra left, and led the club to their first-ever promotion to the Serie A in November. He was subsequently kept as manager for the 2022 campaign.

References

External links

1982 births
Living people
Ecuadorian footballers
Association football defenders
Ecuadorian football managers
Gualaceo S.C. managers